Sebastiano Vini, also known as Bastiano Veronese (c. 1515 in Caprino Veronese – August 11, 1602 in Pistoia) was an Italian painter of the Renaissance period, active mainly in Tuscany.

Biography
He was the son of Giovanni Piero. It is unknown under whom or where he trained, but his work shows the influence of Paolo Veronese. By 1548, he had married in Pistoia and remained there most of his life. His son, Jacopo Vini was also a painter.

He was prolific in Pistoia. Among his works was an Annunciation (1552) for the later-suppressed church of San Pierino alla Porta Lucchese, then moved to the Sacristy of the Prepositura del Montale. He painted a Nativity for the main altar of the Conservatory of San Giovanni Battista. He painted for the churches of Letto and of the Monks of San Sebastiano. He painted another Annunciation for the church of San Giovanni Fuoricivitas, and a Presentation at the Temple for the church of the Servites, Santissima Annunziata.

He painted a large fresco (1596?) for the counter-facade of the Oratory of San Desiderio  and for the church and cloister of San Domenico. He made few works outside Pistoia, including Cutigliano and Florence.

References

1515 births
1602 deaths
16th-century Italian painters
Italian male painters
17th-century Italian painters
Painters from Tuscany
Painters from Verona
Italian Renaissance painters